Abua–Odual (also spelled as Abua/Odual) is a Local Government Area in Rivers State, Nigeria. Its headquarters is located in Ayama/Abua CentralAbua.

It has an area of 704 km and a population of 282,988 at the 2006 census. Abua consists of Otapha, Okpeden, Ogbo Abuan, and Emughan. Each has its own ruler and minimum of seven villages under it.
Late Chief John Mark Miwori was a Justice of Peace in Emesu in 2007.
The postal code of the area is 510102.

References

Local Government Areas in Rivers State
1991 establishments in Nigeria
1990s establishments in Rivers State